Ángel Nieto Roldán (25 January 1947 – 3 August 2017) was a Spanish professional Grand Prix motorcycle racer. He was one of the most accomplished motorcycle racers in the history of the sport, winning 13 World Championships and 90 Grand Prix victories in a racing career that spanned twenty-three years from 1964 to 1986, mainly engaged in 50cc, 80cc and 125cc respectively. His total of 90 Grand Prix victories ranks him third only to the 122 by Giacomo Agostini, and the 115 for Valentino Rossi. In 2011, Nieto was named an FIM Legend for his motorcycling achievements.

Motorcycle racing career
Nieto specialized in racing small displacement bikes such as in the 50 cc, 80 cc and 125 cc classes but many fellow racers, including former world champion Barry Sheene consider him among the greatest motorcycle racers of all time. Though he was never successful at the world level racing in the larger displacements, he won Spanish National Championships in the 50 cc, 125 cc, 250 cc, 500 cc and 750 cc classes. He retired in 1986 at the age of 39 with a total of 90 Grand Prix victories and 13 World Championships. Due to his triskaidekaphobia, he preferred to refer to his championship tally as "12+1".

Later he operated a Grand Prix motorcycle racing team with two riders – his son, Ángel Nieto Jr. and Emilio Alzamora, who won the 125 cc title. He commentated on Grand Prix races for Spanish television. There is an Ángel Nieto museum in Madrid that displays some of his trophies and racing memorabilia. The FIM named him a Grand Prix "Legend" in 2000. Nieto attended the 2008 French Grand Prix at the Le Mans Bugatti Circuit on 18 May 2008, dressed to ride with a special shirt congratulating Valentino Rossi for equalling Nieto's 90 wins. Nieto mounted Rossi's bike, and Rossi as a passenger held a flag aloft with "90 + 90", as they took a victory lap.

Personal life and death 
Ángel Nieto had been living in Ibiza for many years. His two sons, Ángel Jr. and Pablo, both followed their father into motorcycle racing, as well as his nephew Fonsi Nieto.

On 26 July 2017, Nieto was hit by a car while driving his quad bike in Ibiza. He was taken to a hospital with a head trauma where he was put into a medically-induced coma and underwent surgery; his condition had been called "serious but not critical". On 3 August, his condition significantly worsened after being woken from his coma. He died the same day, aged 70.

Nieto on the big screen 
A documentary called Ángel Nieto: 12+1, directed by Álvaro Fernández Armero, was released in 2005. The film covers his entire career and a wide array of competitors, cyclists inspired by him and reporters who covered his career contribute their opinions and impressions regarding his fight to achieve and sustain his goal of world champion. The 1973 year, when Nieto raced with the 125 Morbidelli, is also recalled in the documentary Morbidelli – a story of men and fast motorcycles, released in 2014 and directed by Jeffrey Zani and Matthew Gonzales.

Honours 
 1982: Knight Grand Cross in the Order of Civil Merit.
 1993: Knight Grand Cross in the Royal Order of Sports Merit.

Complete Grand Prix motorcycle racing results 
Points system from 1964 to 1968:

Points system from 1969 onwards:

(key) (Races in bold indicate pole position; races in italics indicate fastest lap)

References

External links

 Ángel Nieto museum photographs
 Ángel Nieto documentary film

1947 births
2017 deaths
People from Zamora, Spain
Sportspeople from the Province of Zamora
Spanish motorcycle racers
50cc World Championship riders
125cc World Championship riders
250cc World Championship riders
80cc World Championship riders
Road incident deaths in Spain
Order of Civil Merit members
Grand Cross of the Order of Civil Merit
125cc World Riders' Champions